ESA Co., Ltd. (Entertainment Studio Asia, Korean: 주식회사 이에스에이), formerly Softmax Co., Ltd. (Korean: 주식회사 소프트맥스) is a Korean video game developer/publisher and entertainment company. They are best known for their War of Genesis series, Magna Carta series, and MMORPG TalesWeaver. It is currently listed in the Korea Stock Exchange .

War of Genesis 

The War of Genesis is a SRPG series developed by Softmax. The series follows the history of Antaria, a fictional universe where the story is taking place. Even though the developers had stated that the third and fourth installments were spin-offs, they follow the main storyline and have many elements that are essential in understanding the stories of the later games. The Side Stories have a rather different gameplay than that of the original. In contrast to the original games' use of the SRPG type of gameplay, Rhapsody of Zephyr uses classical Japanese RPG style similar to that of the Final Fantasy series. Tempest also uses different gameplay. In addition to battles, there are mini-games and simulation elements as well.

 The War of Genesis (1995)
 The War of Genesis II (1996)
 The War of Genesis Side Story I: Rhapsody of Zephyr (1998)
 The War of Genesis Side Story II: Tempest (1998)
 The War of Genesis III (1999)
 The War of Genesis III Part.2 (2000)
 The War of Genesis Arena (On-line) (2000–2004)
 The War of Genesis Mobile: Crow I (2004)
 The War of Genesis Mobile: Crow II (2005)

Magna Carta 

Magna Carta is a series of three South Korean role-playing video games developed by Softmax. It features characters designed by artist Hyung-tae Kim.

Magna Carta: The Phantom of Avalanche (2001)

Magna Carta: Crimson Stigmata (2004)

Magna Carta: Crimson Stigmata is a "port" of the original game to the PlayStation 2. Though the game retains multiple elements from its original counterpart, including the main character and several plot elements, other points in Crimson Stigmata—notably the setting and storyline—are very different from The Phantom of Avalanche.

MagnaCarta 2 (2009)

Reception

Magna Carta series

The Magna Carta series has received mixed reception for Crimson Stigmata and MagnaCarta 2.

References

External links

Software companies of South Korea
Video game companies of South Korea
Entertainment companies of South Korea
Magna Carta (series)